Adrian Romero may refer to:

 Adrian Romero (swimmer) (born 1972), Guamanian swimmer
 Adrián Romero (Argentine footballer) (born 1975)
 Adrián Romero (Uruguayan footballer) (born 1977)